Isidro Rodriguez may refer to:

 Isidro Rodríguez (footballer) (1890s-unknown), Spanish footballer
 Isidro Rodriguez (politician) (1915-1992), Filipino politician and softball official